Kopki  is a village in the administrative district of Gmina Rudnik nad Sanem, within Nisko County, Subcarpathian Voivodeship, in south-eastern Poland.
The village has a population of roughly 1600. The closest towns that neighbour Kopki are Gmina Rudnik nad Sanem and Krzeszów, Lower Silesian Voivodeship.Many parts of Kopki are covered by trees which contain wildlife such as deer, rabbits and different birds.

Before the year of 1344 in Kopki there was a customs chamber at the ancient commercial course from Toruń intercepting Sandomierz, Krzeszów, Lower Silesian Voivodeship , to Lviv and further to Ruś. In 1657, Prince Of The Seven- Pronouns Jerzy Rakoczy burned and completely demolished the village. In 1895, the Volunteer Fire Brigade in Kopki was created. 

Villages in Nisko County